Kostner, formerly known as Kildare, is an 'L' station on the CTA's Pink Line. It is located in the K-Town neighborhood of the North Lawndale community area, often just referred to as Lawndale. Kostner station was originally opened as Kildare. During reconstruction in 2003, its primary entrance was moved one block west to Kostner Avenue and the Kildare entrance became an auxiliary entrance.

This is the first outbound Pink Line station to be located at-grade; immediately to the east of the station, the tracks begin ramping up to an elevated structure and remain elevated for the remainder of the distance to the Loop.

Structure
The station consists of a single at-grade island platform. There are two entrances: a full-service entrance with ticket vending machines at Kostner Avenue and a smaller farecard-only entrance at Kildare Avenue. There is also a canopy extending from each entrance, while the center of the platform is open without any canopy.

Notes and references

Notes 

The Kostner station is, on average, the least used "L" station per year.

References 

Kostner Station Page at Chicago-l.org 
Douglas Line Rehabitation project

External links 

Kildare Avenue entrance from Google Maps Street View
Kostner Avenue entrance from Google Maps Street View

CTA Pink Line stations
Railway stations in the United States opened in 1907
1907 establishments in Illinois
North Lawndale, Chicago